The 1886 Open Championship was the 26th Open Championship, held 5 November at the Musselburgh Links, Musselburgh, East Lothian, Scotland. David Brown won by two strokes from Willie Campbell.

The contest consisted of four rounds of the nine-hole course. There were 42 entries, including seven amateurs. Horace Hutchinson and Johnny Laidlay were the two leading amateurs playing. Local Musselburgh professionals dominated the field, providing 19 of the professional entries.

Brown and John Lambert led after the first round, both scoring 38. Lambert and Willie Campbell led after two rounds on 78, with Brown on 79 with Willie Fernie and Ben Campbell. Brown had an excellent 37 in the third round and took a one-stroke lead over Willie Campbell. They both fared badly at the 3rd hole, where Brown took 7 and Campbell took 8. Campbell was ahead in the final round until he took seven at the 5th, having been bunkered twice on the hole. Eventually Brown finished two ahead of Campbell, finishing with two threes to Campbell's two fours. Willie Park Jr. finished strongly, but his chances were ruined by taking 34 on the first six holes of his first round.

Final leaderboard
Source:

Friday, 5 November 1886

Individual round scores are only known for the leading seven players.

References

External links
Musselburgh Links 1886 (Official site)

The Open Championship
Golf tournaments in Scotland
Open Championship
Open Championship
Open Championship